Towson High School is a high school in Baltimore County, Maryland, United States, founded in 1873. The school's current stone structure was built in 1949. Located in the northern Baltimore suburb of Towson and serving the surrounding communities of Towson, Lutherville, and Ruxton, it is part of the Baltimore County Public Schools system, the 25th largest school system in the nation as of 2005. Area middle schools that feed into Towson High are Dumbarton Middle School, Ridgely Middle School, and Loch Raven Technical Academy, although students from other areas attend the Law and Public Policy magnet school. In 2010, Towson was ranked No. 341 in Newsweek magazine's "America's Best High Schools: The List" annual national survey. In a Baltimore Style readership vote in 2018, Towson High School was named "Best Public High School" in the Baltimore area.

Academics
Towson High school received a 63.8 out of a possible 90 points (70%) on the 2018-2019 Maryland State Department of Education Report Card and received a 4 out of 5 star rating, ranking in the 74th percentile among all Maryland schools.

The school has risen steadily in Newsweek's annual nationwide high school survey during the five-year period culminating in its No. 246 ranking in 2008, having previously placed No. 292 in 2007, No. 317 in 2006, No. 452 in 2005, and No. 511 in 2003. Following publication of the magazine's survey in May 2008, Towson High's then-principal Jane Barranger, said: "I'm very proud of our parents and our kids and our teachers. It takes all of their efforts to make sure that students are prepared to take challenging tests." Barranger retired in June, 2013, after 12 years as the school's principal, succeeded by Charlene DiMino, the current principal. In its 2019 survey of STEM programs, Newsweek ranked Towson #310 among US high schools.

Law and Public Policy Program
The law magnet requires seven total law credits, which can be obtained within the span of four years by approved courses. In the 9th grade, students take AP American Government and Politics and Introduction to Law. In 10th grade, students take a Trial Advocacy and Criminal Law course in a classroom that replicates a courtroom, complete with witness box, jury box, defense/prosecution tables, etc. In the next two years, students can choose from a variety of electives, including Latin, forensic science, philosophy, international law, AP Government, and other law-related courses to fulfill the remaining law credits required for graduation in accordance with the Law and Public Policy magnet.

Students
The 2020-2021 enrollment at Towson High School was 1677 students.

History

Towson High School was originally located on East Chesapeake Avenue, in a small brick structure built in 1873. When it burned down in 1906, a replacement was built on Allegheny Avenue. In 1925, the high school moved to a larger 3-story brick structure at an adjacent site on Central Avenue and the vacated building was converted into an elementary school. This old Allegheny Avenue building still stands today, now used for County offices.

Construction of Towson High School's present-day campus on the grounds of the old Aigburth Vale estate began in the late 1940s, as the Towson area's population surged upward following World War II. The Aigburth Vale house, still standing near the school's athletic field, was added to the National Register of Historic Places in 1999.

When the current campus at Cedar and Aigburth Avenues opened as Towson Senior High School in 1949, the former Central Avenue building became a Junior High School for grades  later, Towson Elementary School. It is now a senior citizen center.

Towson High's current campus underwent a renovation from 1996 to 1999. Classrooms were rebuilt to be smaller, air conditioning was retrofitted, and all exterior doors and windows were replaced.

With the end of racial segregation in Baltimore County public schools in 1954, the African-American student body of the old Carver High School on York Road (now the George Washington Carver Center for Arts and Technology magnet school) was merged with Towson High School.

Structure
The present 5-level stone structure completed in 1949 includes a large auditorium with theater-style seating, a gymnasium, and a cafeteria. Classrooms are on the lower three floors. The fourth floor was originally used for administrative offices, then became an art studio, and currently contains two classrooms and a computer lab. The fifth floor of the school can not be used for classes as it would not comply with fire codes for proper evacuation. It is used to store books, and is occasionally used as an office. In the early 1960s, the fifth floor was also used by a student-operated ham radio station.

The library and science wing were added in the mid-1960s and the entire school underwent extensive upgrading in the late 1990s, including the installation of modern heating and air conditioning. In 2006, the historic stone structure was designated a Landmark by the Baltimore County Landmarks Preservation Commission. 
   
The school exceeded its state-rated capacity of 1,260 pupils in 2007, according to enrollment figures. By 2018, the school exceeded design capacity by approximately 300 students, using portable structures to accommodate the overflow. Various solutions to the overcrowding problem, including the possibility of one or more new schools, have been proposed. The Baltimore County Board of Education included funding for replacement buildings for Towson and Dulaney High School in its overall capital budget request of $216 million for Fiscal Year 2020, renewing the request in its FY2021 budget submittal to the state of Maryland for appropriation.

Athletics
The "Generals" have won the following Maryland state championships:  

{| cellpadding="1" cellspacing="4" style="margin:3px; border:5px solid #810541;"| 
|-
|align="left"|SPORT||align="left"|YEAR
|-
!bgcolor="#000000" colspan="3"|
|-
|align="left"|Boys' Baseball||align="left"|2000
|-
|align="left"|Boys' Basketball||align="left"|1963
|-
|align="left"|Boys' Lacrosse||align="left"|1988, 1989, 19921993, 1994, 1997
|-
|align="left"|Boys' Soccer||align="left"|1972, 1986•, 1991•2003•, 2005•
|-
|align="left"|Boys' Track and Field||align="left"|1953
|-
|align="left"|Boys' Cross Country||align="left"|1952, 1953, 1955,1974, 1987, 2022
|-
|align="left"|Girls' Cross Country||align="left"|1980, 1982, 19842001, 2008, 2022
|-
|align="left"|Girls' Lacrosse||align="left"|1997
|-
|align="left"|Girls' Basketball||align="left"|1998
|-
|align="left"|Mixed-Varsity Badminton||align="left"|2006, 2007, 2008, 2009, 2010, 2013 (County Championships - no State Tournament contested)
|-
|align="left"|Girls' Volleyball||align="left"|2001, 2010
|- align="center" bgcolor=#ffebcd
| colspan="2" | • <small>= denotes co-championsSource: MPSSAA Official Tournament Records</small>
|}

Michael Phelps, as a 15-year-old student at Towson High School, competed in the 2000 Olympics, the youngest American male swimmer to do so, and in 2001 he became the youngest man ever to set a world record in swimming.

The traditional rivals of Towson High School's Generals are the Lions of nearby Dulaney High School.

Notable alumni

The school's alumni association, founded in 1907, says it is "one of the oldest, continuous, public school alumni associations in the U.S.". Well-known alumni include:
 Harry Streett Baldwin (1912) - politician
 Raymond Ward Bissell - art historian and Professor of Art History at the University of Michigan
 Ting Cui – (2020) - figure skater
 Jean Marie Donnell (1938) - movie and TV actress
 John F. Eisold (1964) - U.S. Navy rear admiral and attending physician of the United States Congress
 Evan Farmer - actor / TV personality
 Joyce Hens Green - Federal judge
 Billy Jones – first black basketball player in the ACC
 Andy Karl – singer/actor in seven Broadway shows
 James M. Kelly – special assistant to President Bush, formerly a Maryland House Delegate
 Harris Glenn Milstead (1963) – drag queen, actor and singer better known as 'Divine'
 Ellen O. Moyer – politician
 Lowell Blair Nesbitt (1951) – painter
 Ken Ono – mathematician and film producer
 Santa J. Ono – immunologist and President University of Michigan, President, University of British Columbia, Past President University of Cincinnati
 Michael Phelps (2003) – 28-time Olympic medalist and swimming world record holder
 Mary Watters Risteau (1907) – first woman elected to the Maryland House of Delegates, first woman elected to the Maryland Senate
 William Rush (did not graduate) – member of the Maryland House of Delegates
 Ellen Sauerbrey (1955) – politician
 Dan Szymborski (1996) – sports statistician
 Jack Thomas (1970) - All-American Lacrosse Player
 Derek Waters (1998) - actor, comedian, writer and creator of Drunk History''

References

External links

 Towson High School - Official website

Public high schools in Maryland
Baltimore County Public Schools
Educational institutions established in 1873
Middle States Commission on Secondary Schools
Magnet schools in Maryland
Towson, Maryland
1873 establishments in Maryland